Dane Anthony Dunning (born December 20, 1994) is an American professional baseball pitcher for the Texas Rangers of Major League Baseball (MLB). He made his MLB debut with the Chicago White Sox in 2020.

Career

Amateur career
After graduating from Clay High School in Green Cove Springs, Florida, Dunning attended the University of Florida, where he played college baseball for the Florida Gators. Dunning appeared in 17 games as a freshman, finishing the year with a 4.50 ERA. His sophomore year, Dunning began starting more games, as opposed to the reliever role he had his freshman year, finishing the year with a 4.03 ERA in 16 appearances, 14 of which were starts. As a junior, Dunning returned to the bullpen, the role he predominantly had his freshman year. Dunning appeared in 33 games, only five of which were starts, and had a 2.29 ERA. In the 2016 NCAA Division I baseball tournament, Dunning pitched 15.1 innings, giving up only one run.

Washington Nationals
After his junior year, he was drafted by the Washington Nationals in the first round of the 2016 MLB draft. He split time during his first professional season between the Gulf Coast League Nationals and the Auburn Doubledays where he posted a combined 3–2 win–loss record and a 2.02 earned run average (ERA) in eight games between both teams.

Chicago White Sox
On December 7, 2016, the Nationals traded Dunning, Reynaldo López, and Lucas Giolito to the Chicago White Sox for Adam Eaton. For the 2017 season, the White Sox assigned Dunning to the Kannapolis Intimidators, and after he posted a 0.35 ERA in 26 innings, promoted him to the Winston-Salem Dash, where he spent the rest of the season, posting a 6–8 record and 3.51 ERA in 22 games started. Dunning spent 2018 with both Winston-Salem and the Birmingham Barons, pitching to a combined 6–3 record and 2.71 ERA in 15 starts between both teams.

Dunning underwent Tommy John surgery on March 18, 2019, after suffering a torn ulnar collateral ligament. His surgery was performed by James Andrews. Dunning missed the entire 2019 season. Dunning was added to the White Sox 40–man roster following the 2019 season.

Dunning was called up to the active roster and made his MLB debut on August 19, 2020, striking out seven batters with just one walk in 4 innings in a 5–3 victory over the Detroit Tigers. With the 2020 Chicago White Sox, Dunning appeared in seven games, compiling a 2–0 record with 3.97 ERA and 35 strikeouts in 34 innings.

Texas Rangers
On December 7, 2020, Chicago traded Dunning and Avery Weems to the Texas Rangers in exchange for Lance Lynn. On June 1, 2021, Dunning recorded his first major league hit, a single off of Colorado Rockies starter Germán Márquez. Dunning finished the 2021 season after posting a 5–10 record with a 4.51 ERA and 114 strikeouts over  innings.

Dunning went 4–8 with a 4.46 ERA and 137 strikeouts over  innings for Texas in 2022. He underwent surgery to repair a torn labrum in his right hip at the end of that September, causing him to miss the end of the season.

Personal life 
Dunning is half-Korean, born to a Korean mother, Misu, and an American father, John. He has expressed desire to play for the South Korea national baseball team in the World Baseball Classic. His older brother, Jake, has also pitched in MLB.

References

External links

1994 births
Living people
American baseball players of Korean descent
Arizona Complex League Rangers players
Auburn Doubledays players
Baseball players from Florida
Birmingham Barons players
Chicago White Sox players
Florida Gators baseball players
Gulf Coast Nationals players
Kannapolis Intimidators players
Major League Baseball pitchers
People from Orange Park, Florida
Texas Rangers players
Twitch (service) streamers
Winston-Salem Dash players
Waterloo Bucks players